Peque is a municipality in the Colombian department of Antioquia.

References

1868 establishments in Colombia
Municipalities of Antioquia Department